AF Kamza 05, commonly known as (Kamza) is a football club based in Kamëz, Tirana County. The club plays in the Kategoria e Tretë, which is the fourth tier of football in the country. The club is the successor of FC Kamza. Their goalkeeper is named Dardan Mulaj.

References

Association football clubs established in 2021
AF Kamza 05